Brooklyn Community Board 11 is New York City community board that encompasses the Brooklyn neighborhoods of Bath Beach, Gravesend, Mapleton, and Bensonhurst. It is delimited by Bay 8th Street and 14th Avenue on the west, 61st Street on the north, McDonald Avenue on the east, as well as by Avenue U and Gravesend Bay on the south.

The current chairperson is William Guarinello, and the current district manager is Marnee Elias-Pavia.

As of the 2010 United States Census, the Community Board has a population of 182,000 up from 172,129 in 2000. As of 2010 the population formed of, (44.2 %) White Non-Hispanic, (0.9 %) Black, (39.1 %) Asian, (1.5 %) Other Race, and (14.4 %) of Hispanic origin. With over 55.5% of the residents being foreign born.

During the previous census, the United States Census, 2000, the Community Board had a population of 172,129, up from 149,994 in 1990 and 155,073 in 1980. 
Of them (as of 2000), 111,651 (64.9%) are White non Hispanic, 675 (0.4%) are African-American, 39,590 (23%) Asian or Pacific Islander, 125 (0.1%) American Indian or Native Alaskan, 282 (0.2%) of some other race, 1.362 (2.8%) of two or more race, 4,475 (8.8%) of Hispanic origins.
31.0% of the population benefit from public assistance as of 2004, up from 16.6% in 2000.

References

External links
Profile of the Community Board (PDF)
Official website of the Community Board
Brooklyn neighborhood map

Community boards of Brooklyn
Bensonhurst, Brooklyn